Ran was the counter-intelligence service of the Jewish Yishuv in Mandate Palestine. It was established by Shaul Avigur (Meirov) and Yehuda Arazi (Tannenbaum), the latter a member of the Palestine Police Force. Arazi joined the police on orders from the Haganah, and rose to become a police inspector in the Criminal Investigation Department  (CID).

Ran's primary aim was to thwart the intelligence-gathering operations of the British, Germans, Italians and Americans.

References

Further reading
Friling, Tuvia (2005). Arrows in the Dark: David Ben-Gurion, the Yishuv leadership, and Rescue Attempts During the Holocaust. University of Wisconsin Press. 
Kurzman, Dan (1983). Ben-Gurion, Prophet of Fire. Simon and Schuster. 
Slater, Leonard (1970). The Pledge. Simon and Schuster. 

Law enforcement in Mandatory Palestine
Haganah units
Counterintelligence